Joseph Robert Kirkup (born 17 December 1939) is an English former professional footballer who played as a full-back in the Football League for West Ham United, Chelsea and Southampton.

Playing career
Kirkup played junior football with West Ham United, and was a member of the FA Youth Cup Final team of 1956–57 alongside John Lyall and John Smith. After signing for the senior team at the age of 17, he made his League debut against Manchester City in December 1958. He was a member of the team that won the 1965 European Cup Winners' Cup.

Kirkup made 165 League appearances for West Ham, scoring six goals, before joining Chelsea in March 1966 for £27,000. He made 53 League appearances for the west London club, and joined Southampton in 1967. He made 193 appearances for the Saints, scoring four goals.

In 1975, Kirkup emigrated to South Africa to join Durban City F.C. as player-manager, taking over the post from his old teammate Johnny Byrne. He returned to England in mid-1976 and joined Byfleet Machine & Tool Company.

Honours
West Ham
European Cup Winners' Cup: 1964–65

Chelsea
FA Cup runner-up: 1966–67

References

1939 births
Living people
Sportspeople from Hexham
Footballers from Northumberland
English footballers
England under-23 international footballers
Association football fullbacks
West Ham United F.C. players
Chelsea F.C. players
Southampton F.C. players
Durban City F.C. players
Durban City F.C. managers
English Football League players
English football managers
English expatriates in South Africa
Expatriate soccer players in South Africa
Expatriate soccer managers in South Africa